Finland competed at the Summer Olympic Games for the first time at the 1908 Summer Olympics in London, United Kingdom.  The Grand Duchy of Finland was part of the Russian Empire at the time, but Finland had become a sovereign member of the International Olympic Committee in 1907.

Medals
Verner Weckman became the first Finn to win an Olympic gold. He had also been the first Finn to win a gold at the 1906 Intercalated Games.

Team

Aarne Salovaara and Johan Kemp competed in two sports, among 46 athletes in the games who competed in multiple sports.

No women competed from Finland. However, Valborg Florström performed in a diving exhibition, which made her the first Finnish woman in the Olympics.

Including non-competitors, the Finnish team had 73 athletes and 6 officials. Chef de Mission was Reinhold Felix von Willebrand. The Finnish Comité D'Honneur was Axel Fredrik Londen, Gösta Wasenius and Fred Hackman.

Preparations 

At the time, Grand Duchy of Finland was not an independent country, but an autonomous part of the Russian Empire. However, Finns were qualified to take part independently as a sporting nation, which was a category recently devised by Pierre de Coubertin, in an International Olympic Committee meeting in May 1907. Formal Finnish preparations for the 1908 Games had already began by then. In December, the Finnish Olympic Committee was established, which budgeted 48,000 Finnish markkas (equal to about 200,000 euros in 2018) for a team of 80 to be sent. Half of it was applied from the Senate of Finland, who eventually granted only 8,000 markkas (30,000 €). By June 1908, a further 22,000 markkas (90,000 €) had been raised by various means.

The Finnish Olympic team was mostly selected by trials arranged in the spring of 1908. A few had to be replaced, when gymnastics teachers were defined as professionals.

Most of the Finnish team departed Helsinki aboard steamer Polaris on 7 July 1908. The shooting team had departed on 1 July, and wrestler Verner Weckman travelled independently from Berlin.

Opening ceremony controversies 

Polaris arrived in Hull on 13 July, the day of the opening ceremony, late due to a machine breakdown. A train took them to London, where they went directly from the station to the stadium. The hosts penalized the Finnish tardiness by having them enter the stadium last in the Parade of Nations, instead of their alphabetical position.

A further problem was caused by their flag. There was no official flag of Finland at the time, but they had brought three options, one of which represented the coat of arms of Finland, the other two bearing the texts "Finlandia" and "Suomi-Finland". However, none of them was allowed, and the flag bearer Bruno Zilliacus carried a mere cardboard text plaque "Finland" that was borrowed from their dressing room door.

Contemporary assessment 

The popular opinion in Finland of the overall athletic success of their Olympic team was meager, considering its numbers.

Finnish sports leaders judged the Olympic participation to have been merely an expensive excursion, and pointed out two principal problems. First was an undisciplined and immoral tourist mindset among the team, which manifested as partying, smoking cigarettes and drinking alcohol. Second was a poor organization for the Games, which included a belated preparation only months in advance; minimal equipment for the team, such as bringing only one javelin; and having no professional coaching.

Athletics

Finland's best result was Verner Järvinen's bronze medal in the Greek-style discus throw. The athletics team generally performed up to expectations. Only javelin throw was considered a let down.

Unless otherwise specified, results are lifted from:

Track and road events 

Notes:

Field events 

Notes:

Diving

The Finnish divers had low expectations, as they had previously competed in plain jumps only, and their scores suffered from low degrees of difficulty. Valborg Florström performed a diving exhibition with Ebba Gisico of Sweden, which was the first appearance of women in the Olympic pool.

Results are lifted from:

Gymnastics

Three groups of gymnasts travelled to the Games from Finland. The 26-man main group took part in the team event and 5 men in the individual artistic event. Viipurin Reipas also sent an exhibition team. The Finnish overall result was considered satisfactory.

Shooting

Rifle

The Finnish shooting team performed poorly against expectations and returned in disgrace. The captain of the shooting team, Axel Fredrik Londen, explained in an article that the Finnish shooters could only afford an inferior number of practice shots and inferior gun powder. There also was an import ban on modern bullets and rifles in Finland. Lauri Kolho blamed the fiasco on antiquated gun powder and bullets further impaired by a strong crosswind.

Results are lifted from:

Trap

Sources differ on the Finnish participation in the trap event:
 In the Official Report of the 1908 Olympics (published in 1909), the three Finns are listed among 61 entrants to the trap event. It then details the results for 28 shooters that reached the second stage, implying the Finns were eliminated in the first stage. 
 Bill Mallon and Ian Buchanan in modern research of the 1908 Olympics (2000) argue that out of the 61 entrants, only about 31 started, all of whom were allowed to advance to the second stage, and the Finns never started the event. 
 In a contemporary article (1908), Londen describes himself being at the Games in team leader's form, the Finnish shooters entering rifle events only and never mentions Huber or Fazer.
 The centennial history of the Finnish Olympic Committee (2007) lists Londen as a competitor who was eliminated in the first round without Fazer and Huber.
 The centennial history of the Finnish Shooting Sport Federation (2019) considers Fazer and Huber to not have started the event and Londen eliminated in the first round.

Swimming

The Finnish swimmers had low expectations and took the games as an excursion. They skipped the freestyle events and competed for the first time in backstroke. Also, they were used to a 25 metre track, but the Olympic pool was 100 metres long, which hindered them in their main event, the breaststroke.

Unless otherwise specified, results are lifted from:

Wrestling

Results are lifted from:
 

Ledend: W = win, L = loss, /f = by fall, /p by points

According to rumours, Weckman bribed Saarela to throw the light heavyweight final. Modern sportswriters Arto Teronen and Jouko Vuolle consider that there is plenty of circumstantial evidence in favour.

Sources

References

External links 

 Olympedia — Finland at the 1908 Summer Olympics

Nations at the 1908 Summer Olympics
1908
Olympics